Lourdes Perez Camacho (born September 23, 1928) is a Guamanian Medical Technologist and former First Lady of Guam from 1969 to 1975.

Early life 
On September 23, 1928, Camacho was born as Lourdes Duenas Perez in Tamuning, Guam. Camacho's father was Jesus Flores Perez. Camacho's mother was Margarita Duenas Perez. In 1950, Camacho graduated from Georgia Washington High School.

Education 
In 1954, Camacho earned a Bachelor of Science degree in biology from Mercy College of Detroit in Detroit, Michigan.

Career 
After Catholic Medical Center in Guam opened in July 1955, Camacho became its first Medical Technologist.

In 1969, when Carlos Camacho was appointed by President Richard Nixon as the Governor of Guam, Camacho became the First Lady of Guam on July 1, 1969, until January 4, 1971.

In 1970, Camacho established the American Cancer Society Guam.

In November 1970, when Carlos Camacho won the election as the Governor of Guam, Calvo became the First Lady of Guam. Camacho served as First Lady of Guam on January 4, 1971, until January 6, 1975.

Personal life 
Camacho's husband was Carlos Camacho, a dentist, politician, last appointed Governor of Guam, and first elected Governor of Guam. They have seven children. Camacho's son Felix Perez Camacho became the 7th Governor of Guam. Camacho's only daughter Mary Camacho Torres became a senator in the Guam Legislature. Camacho's other children are Carlos, Thomas, Ricardo, Francis, Victor.

In September 2021, the Guam Legislatures Resolution No. 167-36 (COR) introduced by Amanda L. Shelton celebrated Camacho's 93rd birthday.

References

External links 
 Resolution No. 167-36 (COR) - Amanda L. Shelton - ADOPTED: 9/20/21 at guamlegislature.com

1928 births
First Ladies and Gentlemen of Guam
Guamanian Republicans
Guamanian women in politics
Living people